David Walter Runciman, 4th Viscount Runciman of Doxford,  (born 1 March 1967) is an English academic who teaches politics and history at Cambridge University, where he is Professor of Politics. From October 2014 to October 2018 he was also Head of the Department of Politics and International Studies.

Family and early life
Runciman was born in St John's Wood, North London, England, and grew up there. His father, Garry Runciman, Viscount Runciman, was a political sociologist and academic and his mother, Ruth Runciman, is former chair of the UK Mental Health Commission, a founder of the Prison Reform Trust and former chair of the National Aids Trust. His father, mother, and paternal grandfather and great-grandfather all attended Cambridge. He was educated at Eton College, an all-boys public school in Berkshire, where he won the Newcastle Scholarship. He went on to study at Trinity College, Cambridge.

Runciman is the great-nephew of the historian Sir Steven Runciman. He inherited his family's viscountcy on the death of his father in 2020. From 1997 to 2021 he was married to the food writer Bee Wilson with whom he has three children. Since 2021 he has been married to psychotherapist Helen Runciman (née Lyon-Dalberg-Acton), daughter of Edward Acton.

Career
Runciman began writing for the London Review of Books in 1996 and has written dozens of book reviews and articles on contemporary politics since, for the LRB and a number of other publications.

Runciman has published eight books. An adaptation of his PhD thesis was published in 1997 as Pluralism and the Personality of the State. The Politics of Good Intentions: History, Fear and Hypocrisy in the New World Order (2006) evaluates contemporary and historical crisis in international politics after 9/11 while Political Hypocrisy (2008) explores the political uses of hypocrisy from a historical perspective. The Confidence Trap: A History of Democracy in Crisis from World War I to the Present (2013) lays out his theory of the threat of democratic overconfidence. Profile Books published his books Politics: Ideas in Profile and How Democracy Ends in 2014 and 2018, respectively.  In 2021 he published "Confronting Leviathan: A History of Ideas" looking at some of the most important thinkers and ideas in modern politics.

In October 2014, he was appointed head of the Department of Politics and International Studies at the University of Cambridge. Runciman gave his inaugural lecture on 24 February 2015 on Political Theory and Real Politics in the Age of the Internet. He was preceded in this position by Andrew Gamble and Geoffrey Hawthorn.

One of Runciman's most influential works is Politics: Ideas in Profile. This book explores what politics is, why do we need it and where, in these troubling times, is it heading. Taking the reader across topics such as the gap between rich and poor to the impact of social media on our political climate, it is a useful resource for anyone who is interested in learning about how politics shapes the world. With reference to Machiavelli, Hobbes and Weber, Runciman answers the questions that many ask themselves when discussing politics; such as how there can be such disparity between the wealthiest nations and the least developed.

From 2016 to 2022, Runciman hosted a podcast called Talking Politics with Professor Helen Thompson. The podcast convened a panel of academics from the University of Cambridge and elsewhere to speak about current affairs and politics. It ended in March 2022 after over 300 episodes and 26 million downloads.  Runciman also hosted a spin-off podcast named Talking Politics: History of Ideas. This podcast focused on key thinkers and ideologies from throughout history.

In July 2018, Runciman was elected Fellow of the British Academy (FBA).

In July 2021, he was elected Fellow of the Royal Society of Literature (FRSL).

Runciman was PhD supervisor to Tara Westover, the author of Educated.

How Democracy Ends
Published by Profile Books in 2018, 'How Democracy Ends' takes a look at the political landscape of the West, showing us how to spot the signs that democracy may be under threat. Set out in four major sections:

1. Looking at the role of Coups in ending democracy, looking at both modern and ancient Greece in the process.

2. How major world-shattering catastrophes could kill off democracy, be that nuclear war or the Climate Crisis.

3. He takes a look at our rapidly changing society, specifically technologically and how the advent of Artificial Intelligence could soon be a problem.
 
4. Lastly he takes a look into the future, whether democracy will actually end and if it does, could it be replaced by something better?

Reviews of the book have been received generally positively. Getting a 3.7 out of 5 stars on 'goodreads' and 4.4 out of 5 stars on Amazon. Andrew Rawnsley in The Guardian wrote that the book left him "feeling more positive than I thought I would be"

Criticism
After a negative book review in The Guardian of Antifragility by Nassim Nicholas Taleb, Taleb referred to Runciman as the "second most stupid reviewer" of his works, arguing that Runciman had missed the concept of convexity, the theme of his book. "There are 607 references to convexity", Taleb wrote.

Selected works
 
 
 
 
 
 
 
 
 
 
 
 Runciman, David (2021). Confronting Leviathan: A History of Ideas. Profile Books. ISBN: 9781788167826

References

External links
University of Cambridge profile page
 

1967 births
Living people
People from St John's Wood
Alumni of Trinity College, Cambridge
English people of Scottish descent
People educated at Eton College
Fellows of Trinity Hall, Cambridge
English political scientists
English political writers
English male journalists
The Guardian journalists
Viscounts in the Peerage of the United Kingdom
Date of birth missing (living people)
Place of birth missing (living people)
David Runciman
Fellows of the British Academy
English podcasters